DSW may refer to:

 DSW, the SAME code for a Dust Storm Warning
 Deep South Wrestling, a pro wrestling promotion that was a developmental territory of World Wrestling Entertainment
 The Doon School Weekly, a student newspaper produced by the boys of The Doon School

Personnel
 Diving salvage warfare specialist, a United States Navy enlisted warfare designator
 Doctor of Social Work

Organisations
 DSW (“Designer Shoe Warehouse”), big-box footwear retailer, headquartered in Columbus, Ohio
 German School Washington, D.C. (DSW)
 German Foundation for World Population, an international nongovernmental organization based in Germany

Computing
 Day–Stout–Warren algorithm for balancing binary search trees
 dsw (command), an obsolete Unix command.

See also